Jagatara was a Japanese band centered on Edo Akemi. They are renowned for their unique sound, which has been described as a mixture of rock, especially punk, funk and reggae.

The band formed in March, 1979, and released their first album 'Nanban Torai' 「南蛮渡来」in 1982. Their multi-musical approach resulted in collaborations with differing artists from around the world, such as Mute Beat, John Zorn, and Mahotella Queens. On January 27, 1990, Edo died, and the band broke up shortly after. Since that time there has been an annual concert held by the Shinjuku loft venue in honour of the band, featuring numerous guest musicians performing Jagatara songs.

Jagatara reunited as Jagatara2020 for the first time in 30 years and released the single "Nijiiro Fanfare" on January 29, 2020.

Band members
 Edo Akemi a.k.a. Edo Masataka (江戸 アケミ/ 江戸 正孝)—Vocals
  Edo died in an accident while taking a bath on January 27, 1990.
 Ebby (永井 章 Nagai Akira)—Guitar
 Nabe (渡邊 正己 Watanabe Masami)—Bass
 Oto (村田 尚紀 Murata Naotoshi)—Guitar
 Shino-chan (篠田 昌已 Shinoda Masami)—Saxophone
 Teiyū (中村 貞祐 Nakamura Teiyū)—Drums
 Yoshida Tetsuji (吉田 哲治 Yoshida Tetsuji)—Trumpet
 Yahiro Tomohiro (八尋 知洋 Yahiro Tomohiro)—Percussion
 Murata-kun (村田 陽一 Murata Yōichi)—Trombone
 Emerson Kitamura (北村 賢治 Kitamura Kenzi)—Keyboards
 Minami Sasuga (南 潤子 Minami Junko)—Chorus&Dance
 Yukarie (塚越 優香 Tukakoshi Yukari)—Chorus & Dance, Saxophone

Discography

Singles
'Last Tango in Juku' EP/Record ('Ankokutairiku Jagatara'，1982/5)
'Kazoku Hyaku Kei/Pussy Doctor/Nippon Kabushikigaisha' EP/CD (1985/3)
'Uki Uki' Live 12" (1987/4)
'Ja Bom Be' Live 12" (1988/3)
'Tango' CD (1989/4)
'Ja・Bom・Be' Ja・Bom・Be+Uki Uki [Reissue](1990/3)

Album
'Nanban Torai' LP ('Ankokutairiku Jagatara'，1982/5)
'Kun to odoriakaso u hinode o miru made' LIVE LP (1985/10)
'Hadaka no Ousama' LP （1987/3）
'Robinson's Garden' [Movie Soundtrack] LP (1987/10)
'Nise Yogensha Domo' LP (1987/12)
'Sore Kara' CD (1989/4)
'Gokutsubushi' CD (1989/12)
'Sora Sore' CD (1990/5)
'Oasobi' CD (1990/6)
'Jagatara Naki Jagatara' Live CD (1993/2/7)

Compilation
'Seireki 2000nen Bunno Hansei' CD (1993/2/24)
'Golden Best' CD (2004/12/22)

Video
Tengoku Chuusha no Hiru - VHS
Mi・N・Na - VHS
Rei no Yatsu - VHS
Hey Google - VHS
Nan Nokocchai I - VHS/DVD
Nan Nokocchai II - VHS/DVD
Nan Nokocchai III - VHS/DVD
Baby! Gokigen ni Yatterukai
Kono!! (Mou Gamandekina) - DVD

References

External links 
  (Japanese language)

Japanese rock music groups
Japanese punk rock groups
Reggae fusion groups
Japanese reggae musical groups
Japanese funk musical groups
Musical groups from Tokyo